, also known as "Thorkell the Tall" and "Thorkell the Invincible", is a fictional character from Makoto Yukimura's manga Vinland Saga. Thorkell is introduced Jomsviking commander who later commanded his own band during the invasion of England. He switched sides to fight for the English before choosing to ally himself with prince Canute. He opposes the Vikings who the lead character, Thorfinn, works with, but instead becomes interested in the young Viking for being the son of the warrior Thors.

Thorkell was created as a contrast to the other fighters appearing in the manga who were too serious personalitywise. As a result, Yukimura enjoyed writing Thorkell for making his acts of violence easier to draw.

He is voiced by Akio Otsuka in Japanese, Joe Daniels in the English dub by Sentai Filmworks dub and Patrick Seitz in the Netflix dub. Critical response to the his character was positive for how comical he was, and his fights in the anime were also praised.

Creation
Thorkell is modeled after a person called Thorkell the Tall, a man known for his bravery and built. Manga author Makoto Yukimura imagines that there were men like these "monsters" everywhere during the Viking era, not only famous and unknown. His design also evokes the feeling of a villain who rely on a single type of skill and can be easily be defeated. However, Yukimura wanted Thorkell to be more unique and give Thorkell the feeling of having a lot of strength.

An addition to the anime adaptation of Vinland Saga is the first scene where Thors fights alongside Thorkell before his retiring from the forces. The team was also careful with how adapting the first fight between Thorfinn and Thorkell. Nevertheless, Seko believes Yukimura's version of the narrative is stronger. Once the series' fourth story arc started, Yukimura reflected on Thorfinn, telling a friend that the protagonist highlights how people can change in contrast to others like Thorkell who do not want such effect.

Casting

In the anime adaptation, Thorkell is voiced by Akio Otsuka. He found the an early read of the series' writin, interesting to read even one term that appeared in the work. Otsuka had learned about the Anglo-Saxons and Roman invasions a long time ago, and could imagine that there were various conflicts among the people of Europe. In particular, Thorkell's views on religion and life and death were clearly different from those of other humans, so the voice actor thought it would be interesting to be able to express that properly. In his case, Otsuka tries to find out what kind of sound comes out of the body that fits in with the picture. In the case of Thorkell, although his body is large, he has a childish inside, the actor thought that he would make a voice like a lion. He tried to make a sound that does not force you to go along with the thin face and the hairstyle that looks like it's falling upwards. He enjoyed working Yuto Uemura (Thorfinn) and Naoya Uchida (Askeladd) due to the dialogues the series has when their characters interact.

He wanted to express the image of an inhuman person who kills a bear by folding it in a way that does not ruin with the dialogue. Furthermore, it has to be a different existence, and the most important point in making a role is to have different thoughts from everyone else. Where most people feel frustrated and scared, Thorkell does not feel the same way. Otsuka thinks that searching for the criteria for where Thorkell feels frustration and fear is the boundary between whether or not the image of Thorkell can be clarified. Otsuka noted that Throkell was popular for not only for his superhuman strength, but also for his sense of honor. Due the multiple moods Thorkell displays in few moments, Otsuka believes the handling of the character can be taken differently if it were an anime or a live-action. He enjoyed working Yuto Uemura (Thorfinn) and Naoya Uchida (Askeladd) due to the dialogues the series has when their characters interact.

In the English localization of Vinland Saga Joe Daniels plays Thorkell in the Sentai Filmworks dub and Patrick Seitz in the Netflix dub.

Characterization and themes
As the series is notorious for its violent first story arc, Yukimura noted that all the characters including the protagonist Thorfinn had no room for jokes. However, Thorkell is an exception and helpful to write comedy as his characterization is that of a cheerful man who can change the violence into comedy. While Yukimura dislikes violence, he feels that he can handle the cruelty characterization Thorkell has.

Since Thorkell is the in charge of comedy and there is a cute side, Akio Otsuka was especially careful not to stick to low notes. He wanted to express the image of an inhuman person who kills a bear by folding it in a way that does not ruin with the dialogue. Furthermore, it has to be a different existence, and the most important point in making a role is to have different thoughts from everyone else. Where most people feel frustrated and scared, Thorkell does not feel the same way. Otsuka thinks that searching for the criteria for where Thorkell feels frustration and fear is the boundary between whether or not the image of Thorkell can be clarified. Otsuka noted that Throkell was popular for not only for his superhuman strength, but also for his sense of honor. Due the multiple moods Thorkell displays in few moments, Otsuka believes the handling of the character can be taken differently if it were an anime or a live-action.

Appearances
Thorkell is a Jomsviking general, brother of the Jomsviking Chief, uncle-in-law of Thors and grand uncle of Thorfinn. A giant man who loves combat, he defects from the Danish army to become a mercenary for the English, believing that fighting his fellow Vikings will give him a better challenge. This same love of war leads him to support Prince Canute's bid for kingship of the Danes. He remains under Canute once he becomes king. Before the defection of Thors, Thorkell worked with and highly respected the man, resulting in a fondness for his son Thorfinn. He duels twice with Thorfinn and dominates each time, though he loses two fingers in the first duel and an eye in the second. In battle, Thorkell typically wields a pair of axes as his primary weapons, but his greatest asset is probably his vast physical strength. Due to his colossal power, Thorkell is considered the strongest Viking and warrior in the series, with one character believing that 4000 men aren't enough to stop Thorkell. He fights with a band of Vikings called the Death Seekers who share his love for war. Thorkell's character is based on Thorkell the Tall, a historical Jomsviking lord who is a mentor to Canute in the Flateyjarbók.

Reception
Critical response to Thorkell's character was generally positive. According to Anime News Network, the character "represents the slightly more exaggerated style of action and characterization" surprassing the already overpowered Thors but in a more comical yet dark fashion as he does not care about his own wounds. 4Gamer enjoyed Thorkell's introduction for his fight against Thorfinn due to the animation of the fight coreography which leads to possibilities of more of these similar battles. Anime UK News said that while Thorkell is initially presented a main antagonist due to how he took Canute, the narrative does not make a black and white morality as Askeladd's forces are still presented as overly violent to civilians. Manga.Tokyo still called him a "madman" for how he loves fighting and his betrayal to the Vikings just to make such conflict more interesting to him. His first fight against Thorfinn was praised due to not only well animated it was, but also because of how the two warriors use their own skills to fight as a result of possessing different builds. In summing up his introduction, Manga.Tokyo called Thorkell "the actual fortress, not the bridge" due to his massive strength. In a following review, Thorkell was once again recognized for his fighting skills despite having been inflicted several wounds by Thorfinn when they first met.

Thorkell's fight against Thorfinn was a nominee in the 4th Crunchyroll Anime Awards in 2020 for "Best Fight" but lost to Demon Slayer: Kimetsu no Yaiba.

Manga News found Thorkell's first meeting with Thorfinn interesting not only because of their fight but also because of their relationship, as Thorkell is fascinated by the protagonist's skills and remains interested in seeing him again due their connection with Thors. The site felt that while Thorkell only cares about war, he retains a sense of war which makes him reliable to his own soldiers. Comic Book Resources stated that Yukimura took liberties with his take on Thorkell as he is playful and often interested in Thors' honor while he is still connected with Canute. Following several battles, Anime News Network enjoyed how Thorkell was used for the first time in the narrative for character relationships rather than more battles even if he is still comical when compared with the others. The revelation of him being linked with Thors and emotional past with him was also well received by the critic. His second battle with Thorfinn was also found enjoyable for how much honor Thorkell displays when he is taken down despite losing an eye in combat. The Fandom Post found the relationship between Thorkell and Thorfinn interesting but lamented how the latter is not changed by the fact that both know Thors or are related by blood. In a general overview of the manga, Anime News Network called Thorkell as possessing a "psychotic enthusiasm" which is both "charming and terrifying" which makes him one of the most appealing fighters from the series' first story arc alongside Thorfinn and Askeladd. Akio Otsuka's voice acting was praised by Yukimura.

References

External links
  

Fictional mass murderers
Comics characters introduced in 2005
Fictional swordfighters in anime and manga
Fictional Vikings
Male characters in anime and manga
Male characters in television